Corunna is a village in Eurobodalla Shire on the South Coast of New South Wales. It is located 357 km south of Sydney, and 53 km south of Moruya.

References

Towns in New South Wales
Towns in the South Coast (New South Wales)
Eurobodalla Shire